Matin Ahmed Khan was a Pakistani academic, marketing expert and management educator.

He served as Dean and Director of the Institute of Business Administration from 1972 to 1977 and contributed greatly to the development of academic standards throughout the country.

Career 
He begin his education from the Aligarh university in the early 1940s. He became the first Muslim PhD in business administration. He received his MA from the Wharton School of the University of Pennsylvania and DBA from the University of Southern California. His areas of research and teaching include marketing, market research and consumer behaviour. He was associated as Project Director for almost a decade with JRP-IV, a research project on Slum Improvement. He has been a Visiting Professor at Ahmadu Bello University, Nigeria. Khan has authored a large number of books and articles on marketing and research methodology including:

Research methodology for business and social problems. University Grants Commission, 1989.
Wholesale trade in Karachi. Institute of Public and Business Administration, University of Karachi, 1959.

He has also published widely in business journals and the media.
After his retirement from  IBA in the early 1990s he helped Hakeem Muhammad Saeed in developing Hamdard University of managmnet sciences and become Life Research Professor and Dean, Faculty of Management Sciences, Hamdard Institute of Management Sciences, Karachi.
In 2007 President Pervez Musharraf conferred civil awards on 154 citizens of Pakistan for excellence in various fields of activities. The Sitara-e-Imtiaz was awarded to Dr Matin Ahmed Khan for service to Education. Matin ahmed khan's grandson is named after the beloved educator; Matin Ahmed Khan Jr.

After two weeks of illness he died on 22 June 2014 aged 93 years old. He was survived by his spouse, 4 sons, 8 grandsons and 3 granddaughters.

References

Academic staff of Ahmadu Bello University
2014 deaths
Academic staff of the Institute of Business Administration, Karachi
Academic staff of Hamdard University
Executive Directors of the Institute of Business Administration, Karachi
Wharton School of the University of Pennsylvania alumni
University of Southern California alumni